Armillaria fellea is a species of mushroom in the family Physalacriaceae. This species is found in Australia.

See also 
 List of Armillaria species

References 

fellea
Fungal tree pathogens and diseases